The 1900 Texas gubernatorial election was held to elect the Governor of Texas. Incumbent Governor Joseph D. Sayers was re-elected to a second term in office.

General election

Candidates
H. G. Damon (Prohibition)
R. E. Hanney (Republican)
T. J. McMinn, San Antonio politician (Populist)
Lee Lightfoot Rhodes, former Populist State Representative from Van Zandt County (Socialist)
G. H. Royal, nominee for Governor in 1898 (Socialist Labor)
Joseph D. Sayers, incumbent Governor (Democratic)

Results

References

1900
Texas
1900 Texas elections